Fort Worth Vaqueros FC is an American amateur soccer club based in Fort Worth, Texas, which began play in the National Premier Soccer League (NPSL) in May 2014. The Vaqueros play in the Lone Star Conference of the South Region. The club is based at Farrington Field, a facility owned by the Fort Worth Independent School District.
The team's name was announced at the Fort Worth Livestock Exchange Building on February 13, 2014, after a name the team contest. The team's official logo was selected by the fans then revealed by the team on March 20, 2014. The team played its inaugural 2014 season at historic LaGrave Field but had to relocate in 2015 after the Fort Worth Cats, from whom the Vaqueros had been subletting the field, lost their lease.

Seasons

Honors
Lone Star Conference Regular Season Championship (1): 2017
Trinity River Cup Championship (1): 2019
Chisolm Trail Clásico Championship (1): 2019
Lone Star Conference Championship (1): 2019

Club culture

Supporters
Playing at the historic LaGrave Field, the Vaqueros welcomed 2,700 fans to their first home game and enjoyed an average attendance of 2,000 fans during the 2014 season. The main supporters group for the Vaqueros is named The 
Panther City Hellfire, a name taken from a historic Fort Worth nickname.

The Vaqueros have a close connection with their fans, involving them in the evolution and growth of the club. When the team was first created and needed a name and logo, the club allowed the fan community to create, submit and vote on what both of these aspects would look like. Many names were submitted, but the final decision was between Fort Worth United, Fort Worth Vaqueros FC and Panther City FC, with Fort Worth Vaqueros FC ultimately being selected. Vaqueros season ticket holders do not receive paper tickets to the games, but instead receive a free team jersey that they wear to each game as their ticket into the game. The club supporters come mainly from the city of Fort Worth and the surrounding Metroplex communities.

Rivalries
When the Vaqueros first entered the NPSL, they had an instant rival in Dallas City FC. With the teams in close proximity to each other in the Dallas–Fort Worth metroplex, there is a natural rivalry between the two clubs. In addition to their conference play, the Vaqueros play a two leg cup series against Dallas City. The name of this cup was selected by both teams' fans, from the DFW area through social media. The Vaqueros lost the first Trinity River Cup to Dallas City FC in 2014, suffering a 2–0 loss in the first leg and a 1–0 loss in the second leg.

Beginning in 2016, the Vaqueros began a two-leg (non-league) series with Shreveport Rafters FC, called the Texas Trail Classic. Shreveport won the inaugural cup.

In 2019, the Chisholm Trail Clásico began, pitting the Vaqueros against the Denton Diablos FC.

Kit manufacturers and sponsorships

Team

Coaching staff
Head coach: Tony Merola
Assistant coach:

Youth Academy 
Head coach: Mark Snell

Players

Partnerships
On January 1, 2015, Vaqueros owner Michael Hitchcock and the newly formed Legend Football Partners acquired a significant interest in English soccer club Alfreton Town F.C. From this acquisition, Fort Worth Vaqueros formed a partnership with the English club, creating an avenue for player sharing, cross marketing, international matches and preseason training in both countries. "This move automatically makes the Vaqueros a stronger organization through the benefits of sharing players, training techniques, matches and the collaboration of ideas from two different soccer nations," said Hitchcock.

In August 2015, Hitchcock's Playbook Management International expanded the Vaqueros family ties by acquiring a stake in Tobago FC Phoenix 1976.

References

External links
Fort Worth Vaqueros official website

Association football clubs established in 2013
National Premier Soccer League teams
Sports in Fort Worth, Texas
Soccer clubs in Texas
2013 establishments in Texas